Dudley Laufman (born 1930) is an American contra and barn dance caller and musician widely credited with helping spur the revival of contra in the 20th century.

Early life
Laufman was born in 1930 and grew up in Arlington, Massachusetts.

Involvement with contra dance
Laufman attended his first dance as a boy while working at the Mistwold Farm in Fremont, New Hampshire in 1948. In 1959, he moved to Canterbury, New Hampshire. He was a founding member of the Canterbury Country Dance Orchestra in 1965.

He began calling and playing for dances, which became known as "Dudley Dances". At times, he was the only remaining callers of contra dances with live music. He worked to spread the tradition, which ultimately caught on and has since spread across the United States and internationally.

Beginning in 1978, Laufman started working with the New Hampshire Artists-in-the-Schools program, teaching contra dances to children.

Recognition
Laufman is a recipient of a 2009 National Heritage Fellowship awarded by the National Endowment for the Arts, which is the United States government's highest honor in the folk and traditional arts.

References

External links
 Picture Perfect: Portraits Of NEA National Heritage Fellows

National Heritage Fellowship winners
Square dance
Contra dance callers
Musicians from New Hampshire
People from Arlington, Massachusetts
Living people
1930 births
People from Canterbury, New Hampshire